Niagara Falls Public Library may refer to:

Niagara Falls Public Library (New York), a public library system in the city of Niagara Falls, New York, United States
Niagara Falls Public Library (Ontario), a public library system in the city of Niagara Falls, Ontario, Canada
Niagara Falls Public Library, a former Carnegie library in Niagara Falls, New York